Die Frontschau (English:The Front Show) is a series of German World War II era military training films, shown to German soldiers shortly before deployment to the Eastern Front. These films were directed by the veteran propagandist Fritz Hippler, best known for Der Ewige Jude.

The installments in the series are:
 FS 11 Terrain Difficulties in the East, Winter and Spring (1943)
 FS 9/10 Construction of Positions (1941)
 FS 8 Defensive Battle in Winter (1943)
 FS 7 Attack by Infantry and Armor Against a Village (1941)
 FS 5/6 Mountains Troops Battle for a Town (1941)
 FS 4 Infantry on the Attack (1941)
 FS 3  Advance (1941)
 FS 2 Russian Construction of Positions (1941)
 FS 13 Traveling Across Ice Surfaces and Waters with Drifting Ice (1941)

See also 
List of German films of 1933–1945

External links 
Extensive information on the series from International Historic Films

1941 films
1943 films
Films of Nazi Germany
Films directed by Fritz Hippler
German black-and-white films
1940s German films